Phyllonorycter quercifoliella is a moth of the family Gracillariidae. It is known from all of Europe, except for the Mediterranean islands.

The wingspan is 7–9 mm. The forewings are shining pale golden-ochreous ; a whitish dark-margined median streak from base to beyond middle;four costal and three dorsal shining
white wedge-shaped spots, dark- margined anteriorly and first costal posteriorly; a black apical dot;an indistinct dark hook in apical cilia. Hindwings are grey.
The larva is ochreous-whitish ; head brown.

There are two generations per year with adults on wing in April and May and again in August and September.

The larvae feed on Quercus cerris, Quercus faginea, Quercus libani, Quercus petraea, Quercus robur, Quercus trojana and Quercus x turneri. They mine the leaves of their host plant. They create a lower surface tentiform mine. The lower epidermis has one sharp fold. Pupation takes place in a tough silken cocoon within the mine. The cocoon of the summer generation is entirely covered with frass and attached to the roof of the mine only. In the autumn generation, frass is incorporated in the sides and rear of the cocoon and the cocoon is attached both to the roof and the floor of the mine.

References

External links

quercifoliella
Moths described in 1839
Moths of Europe
Taxa named by Philipp Christoph Zeller